Bridging a Gap is an album by vocalist Mark Murphy which was recorded in 1972 and released on the Muse label.

Reception

The AllMusic review by Ron Wynn stated: "The celebrated bop, ballads, standards, and scat vocalist sings with customary verve, clarity, and confidence, backed by a combo featuring Mike and Randy Brecker, Ron Carter, and more."

Track listing
All compositions by Mark Murphy except where noted
 "Come and Get Me" – 3:37
 "Sausalito" – 3:42
 "She's Gone" – 2:50
 "Steamroller" (James Taylor) – 3:14
 "We Could Be Flying" (Michel Colombier) – 3:39
 "Sunday in New York" (Peter Nero, Carroll Coates) – 5:08	
 "Gee, Baby, Ain't I Good to You" (Andy Razaf, Don Redman) – 3:01
 "No More" (Tutti Camarata, Bob Russell) – 3:12
 "As Time Goes By" (Herman Hupfeld) – 3:01
 "I'm Glad There Is You" (Jimmy Dorsey, Paul Mertz) – 5:03

Personnel
Mark Murphy – vocals
Randy Brecker – trumpet
Michael Brecker – tenor saxophone
Sam Brown – guitar 
Pat Rebillot – piano, organ
Ron Carter – bass 
Jimmy Madison (tracks 1 & 3–5) – drums, percussion

References

Muse Records albums
Mark Murphy (singer) albums
1973 albums